Kevin Skadron is an American computer scientist, the Harry Douglas Forsyth Professor and Chair of Computer Science, and Director of the Center for Research on Intelligent Storage and Processing in Memory (CRISP) and the Center for Automata Processing (CAP), at the University of Virginia, Charlottesville, Virginia. His research focuses on computer processor design under physical constraints such as temperature, power, and reliability.  He and his colleagues have contributed numerous tools now widely used in the research community, including the HotSpot family of tools and the Rodinia Benchmark Suite. Skadron also helped co-found IEEE Computer Architecture Letters and served as editor-in-chief from 2010 to 2012.

Education and career
Skadron received his BS in Electrical and Computer Engineering and his BA in economics from Rice University in 1994. He then moved to Princeton University, pursuing doctoral research in Computer Science, with Doug Clark as his dissertation advisor and Margaret Martonosi as co-advisor. He earned his PhD in 1999. He became an assistant professor of computer science at the University of Virginia in August 1999. He has served as department chair since 2012.

Awards and honors
Skadron received the ACM SIGARCH Maurice Wilkes Award in 2011 for outstanding contributions to thermal-aware computer architecture modeling and design and was named Fellow of the Institute of Electrical and Electronics Engineers (IEEE) in 2013 for contributions to thermal modeling in microprocessors, and ACM Fellow for contributions in power- and thermal-aware modeling, design and benchmarking of microprocessors, including GPUs.

References

External links

20th-century births
Living people
American computer scientists
Rice University alumni
University of Virginia faculty
Fellow Members of the IEEE
Fellows of the Association for Computing Machinery
Year of birth missing (living people)
Place of birth missing (living people)